The TS-50 is a  diameter circular Italian blast resistant minimum metal anti-personnel mine designed and produced by Valsella Meccanotecnica (Italy).

Description
The mine has a ribbed plastic case which is olive green, brown or sand colored. The mine has a central raised pressure pad on the top surface of the mine, but is designed to operate even with the mine upside down. Pressure on the mine forces air through a diaphragm into a small rubber air bag, which inflates. As the bag inflates it pushes a shutter, which in turn removes the striker retaining lug. The striker is free to impact the detonator. The mine requires a constant pressure of approximately 2 to 5 kg (5 to 11 lbs) for an average of 0.11 seconds before the fuze will detonate. This allows the mine to be laid in a high density pattern without the shock of a detonation impacting the nearby mines.

The design of the TS-50's fuze gives it a large degree of resistance to explosive overpressure clearance techniques, because the short sharp shock from an explosion does not last long enough to force enough air into the air bag to trigger the mine. This feature, combined with the use of non-magnetic metals used in the mine, make it difficult to clear using conventional techniques. A metal "detector" disc is provided with the mine to make it more detectable, however it is rarely used.

Additionally, the mine is waterproof and can be used in shallow water. The mine can be either laid by hand or scattered by helicopter from the DAT mine dispenser system.

Production
The mine was originally produced by Tecnovar italiana SpA, and was in service with the Italian army. When the anti-personnel mine ban came into force the Italian army destroyed all its stocks of the mine. It is very similar to another Italian mine, the VS-50. TS-50 mines were widely exported and also were produced under license in Egypt. Uncleared minefields containing TS-50 mines are located in Afghanistan, Azerbaijan, Ecuador, Georgia, Kurdistan, Kuwait, Iraq, Lebanon, Rwanda and the Western Sahara.

Designations
T/79 – Egyptian army designation for a locally produced version of the TS-50 mine. More than 1.2 million T/79s have been produced. Most T/79 landmines were assembled by Egyptian factories, using a combination of imported Italian parts and locally manufactured components.
YM-1 – designation for an Iranian copy of the TS-50 mine.

Specifications
Diameter: 90mm
Height: 45mm
Weight: 185 grams
Explosive content: 50 grams of Composition B
Operating pressure: 12.5 kg

See also
VS-50 mine
VS-MK2 mine
TC/6 mine

Notes

References
Brassey's Essential Guide to Anti-personnel landmines, Eddie Banks.
Jane's Mines and Mine Clearance 2005–2006

Anti-personnel mines
Land mines of Italy